Xylotrechus nauticus is a species of beetle in the family Cerambycidae. It was described by Mannerheim in 1843.

References

Xylotrechus
Beetles described in 1843